Daphne Bloomer (born 1973 in Oklahoma City/Forest Park, Oklahoma) is an American actress known for appearing on the soap opera Days of Our Lives. Ms. Bloomer's first taste of acting came when she was in school at Monroney Junior High in Midwest City, Oklahoma. She attended the University of Oklahoma for two weeks before deciding to pursue a career in acting.  She relocated to Los Angeles, where she enrolled at the University of California, Los Angeles, majoring in theatre.

Ms. Bloomer first appeared in the recurring role of Eugenia Willens on Days of our Lives April 8, 2002. Although the character was initially intended to appear in just two episodes, Bloomer ended up portraying the role until June 3, 2003 and returned October 12, 2004 to April 25, 2006.  Ms. Bloomer has appeared in several stage productions, including The Tangled Snarl, a two-part play that featured other former and current (at the time) Days of our Lives actors.

Roles
Days of Our Lives – Eugenia Willens (April 8, 2002 – June 3, 2003; October 12, 2004 – April 25, 2006) 
Who Made the Potatoe Salad? – Mookie (2006)
General Hospital – Marty (2003)
Strong Medicine – Cherisse (2003)

External links 

1973 births
Living people
Actresses from Oklahoma City
American soap opera actresses
American television actresses
UCLA Film School alumni
21st-century American women